Henry Gregory may refer to:

Henry Gregory (instrument maker) (1744–1782), English mathematical and optical instrument maker
Henry Gregory (politician) (1860–1940), Australian politician
Sir Henry Holman Gregory (1864–1947), British MP for South Derbyshire, 1918–1922
Henry Gregory (cricketer) (born 1936), English cricketer

See also
Harry Gregory (disambiguation)
Gregory W. Henry, American astronomer